Upper Flagstone is a rural locality in the Lockyer Valley Region, Queensland, Australia. In the  Upper Flagstone had a population of 171 people.

Geography 
The locality is dominated by an east/west valley containing Flagstone Creek. The valley remains mostly covered in natural vegetation. Flagstone Creek Conservation Park is in the south-east of the locality.

History
In 1840, the penal colony at Moreton Bay was being prepared to be turned into a free settlement (which ultimately became the city of Brisbane). As there was settlement already occurring on the Darling Downs, there was a need for Lieutenant Owen Gorman, the last commandant of the penal colony, to find a wagon route between the two locations, but the obstacle was the mountains of the Great Dividing Range. There was a route already known at Cunninghams Gap but it was not able to be used by a wagon. A convict John Sterry Baker had escaped from the penal colony in 1826 and had lived among the Goomburra Aboriginal people in the Lockyer Valley area and walked with them on a track to the top of the range. Having returned to the penal colony in 1840, Baker told Gorman of the track up the range and modified an Irish jaunting car to test as a wagon on the route. Together Gorman and Baker ascended the range with their wagon on 17 October 1840 arriving at Eton Vale. Despite the fact that Gorman did not discover the route, it nonetheless became known as Gorman's Gap Road. The route which runs between Upper Flagstone in the west and Flagstone Creek in the east was marked by blazing a line of trees.  It became the first gazetted road in Queensland. Today, the road no longer officially exists and is overgrown but can still be followed. There are three monuments along the route, one at each end and the other along the route at Camel's Hump where Gorman took his compass bearing.

In the  Upper Flagstone had a population of 171 people.

Education 
There are no schools in Upper Flagstone. The nearest government primary schools are Middle Ridge State School in neighbouring Middle Ridge to the north-west, Gabbinbar State School in Centenary Heights to the north-west, and Flagstone Creek State School in neighbouring Flagstone Creek to the east. The nearest government secondary school is Centenary Heights State High School in Centenary Heights.

References

Lockyer Valley Region
Localities in Queensland